The Golden Pear  is an award for outstanding achievements in newspaper, television and radio journalism in Poland. It was established in 1989 and is administered by The Association of Journalists of the Republic of Poland in Kraków.

Prizes are awarded yearly in three categories. The winners are awarded a statuettes of golden or green pears.

Awarded

External links
 Official website

References 

Polish awards
Journalism awards
1989 establishments in Poland
Awards established in 1989